Carmen Juneau (August 25, 1934 – June 18, 1999) was a Canadian politician, who served in the National Assembly of Quebec from 1981 to 1994 and as mayor of Windsor, Quebec from 1995 until her death in 1999. In provincial politics, she represented the electoral district of Johnson as a member of the Parti Québécois.

Following Juneau's death, a municipal park in Windsor was named in her honour in 2002.

References

External links
Carmen Juneau at the National Assembly of Quebec

1934 births
1999 deaths
Parti Québécois MNAs
French Quebecers
Women MNAs in Quebec
Mayors of places in Quebec
Women mayors of places in Quebec
People from Windsor, Quebec
20th-century Canadian women politicians